The , signed as Route Y, is one of the routes of the Shuto Expressway system in the Tokyo area. It connects the Inner Circular Route at Kandabashi Junction in Chiyoda Ward to the Tokyo Expressway at Nishi-ginza Junction in Chūō Ward. It primarily serves Tokyo Station and its surroundings. All large truck traffic is banned on this route.

History
The Yaesu Route was completed in two phases. The first section of the expressway to be completed was the short section of expressway that links the southern end of the Tokyo Expressway to the Inner Circular Route in 1964. The main part of the expressway between Kandabashi and Nishi-Ginza was completed in 1973.

List of interchanges
The entire expressway is in Tokyo.

Shiodome spur route

Route description
A short section of expressway between the Inner Circular Route and the southern end of the Tokyo Expressway is designated as a section of the Yaesu Route.

List of interchanges
The entire expressway is in Tokyo.

See also

References

External links

Y
1964 establishments in Japan
Roads in Tokyo